Hà Tĩnh is a province on the North Central Coast of Vietnam. Together with neighbouring Nghệ An province the two provinces are together called "Nghệ Tĩnh", and the locals are  known for speaking Vietnamese with a very noticeable regional accent.

Geography
Hà Tĩnh province is located in the northern part of central Vietnam, about 340 km (211 miles) south of Hanoi, bordered by Nghệ An province to the north, Quảng Bình province to the south, Laos to the west, and the Eastern Sea to the east.

Climate
The climate is sub-tropical, with cooler temperatures in winter; Vietnam's highest ever temperature, 43.4 degrees Celsius (110 Fahrenheit), was recorded in the province in 2019.

Administrative divisions
Hà Tĩnh is subdivided into 13 district-level sub-divisions:

 10 districts:

 Cẩm Xuyên
 Can Lộc
 Đức Thọ
 Hương Khê
 Hương Sơn
 Kỳ Anh
 Lộc Hà
 Nghi Xuân
 Thạch Hà
 Vũ Quang

 2 district-level towns:

 Hồng Lĩnh
 Kỳ Anh (newly created as of 2015)

 1 provincial city:
 Hà Tĩnh (capital)

They are further subdivided into 12 commune-level towns (or townlets), 235 communes, and 15 wards.

Tourism and notables

Hà Tĩnh has many locations of historical and cultural interest that are popular with tourists. It is home to national figures such as Lê Hữu Trác, Nguyễn Du (the author of the epic poem Kim Vân Kiều), Nguyễn Công Trứ, Phan Đình Phùng, Trần Phú, Ngô Đức Kế, Nguyễn Phan Chánh, Hoàng Ngọc Phách, Xuân Diệu, Huy Cận, Hoàng Xuân Hãn, Nguyễn Khắc Viện, Lê Văn Thiêm, Điềm Phùng Thị and Nguyen Do. Notable scenic areas include La River, Vũ Môn Falls, Vũ Quang Garden, Kẻ Gỗ Lake, Sơn Kim hot springs, Đèo Ngang pass, Hương Tích Pagoda, and beaches in places such as Thiên Cầm, Ðèo Con, Xuân Thành and Chân Tiên. Most of them are along Highways 1A and 8.

Transport 

Hà Tĩnh has 130 km (82 miles) of Highway 1A stretching from Bến Thủy Bridge (Vinh City) to Đèo Ngang Pass linking Hà Tĩnh and Quảng Bình. The Ho Chi Minh Route is the second most important route of the province. Hà Tĩnh also contains Road 8 which runs from Hồng Lĩnh town to Laos and the Viet-Lao highway from Vũng Áng Harbour (Kỳ Anh District) to Laos. In 2007, a railway link to Laos was proposed from Hà Tĩnh province.

Economy 

Agriculture, forestry and fishery takes up 35.5 percent of total GDP and the province's GDP accounts for 0.7 percent of Vietnam's GDP. Hà Tĩnh has taken slow steps in economic reforms though better signs in recent times are incentive. Vũng Áng harbour with some plants, factories and a thermal power station is becoming the most active economic hub. Vietnam Steel operates an iron mine in Thạch Khê District, with reserves of 544 million tonnes of iron, which is one of the largest mines in southeast Asia.

A US$10 billion iron and steel plant was built in Vũng Áng in the 2010s (see Formosa Ha Tinh Steel Corporation). The steel plant is part of an industrial park, which is estimated to cost more than US$20 billion. When finished in 2020, the industrial park will have a port, a 2,100-MW power plant and a steel plant with six blast furnaces. In 2016, the Formosa Steel plant released untreated waste water with heavy metals and other toxins into the nearby sea, which caused the 2016 Vietnam marine life disaster.

History
Beginning in 1930 Hà Tĩnh, along with Nghệ An and Quảng Ngãi, was one of the early grounds for the Vietnamese rural Soviet movement and protests.

References

External links 
 Hà Tĩnh province People's Committee 
 Poverty alleviation in Hà Tĩnh Province, Vietnam: A public archive of development project documents

 
North Central Coast
Gulf of Tonkin
Provinces of Vietnam